The Killers of Comedy Tour featured cast and regulars from The Howard Stern Show such as Reverend Bob Levy, Sal Governale, Richard Christy, Jim Florentine, Yucko the Clown and Shuli performing stand up comedy. On occasion, Beetlejuice, Gary the Conqueror, Bigfoot and The Iron Sheik participate. A recurring joke is Bob Levy eating blue cheese or whipped cream out of a woman's rear end. It also featured up and coming stand up comedians like John Tole & Brad Thacker who toured & hosted the shows.

References

External links
 The Killers of Comedy Official Website
 The Killers of Comedy Official Youtube Channel
 The Killers of Comedy Grover Rap Ad
 Official Killers Of Comedy Tickets CleanBox Entertainment – http://www.CleanBoxEntertainment.com 

Comedy tours
Sirius Satellite Radio